The 2005 Tarapacá earthquake occurred on June 13 at 22:44:33 UTC (18:44:33 local time). Its epicenter was located near Mamiña, in northern Chile about 125 km east-northeast of Iquique, affecting the Tarapacá Region and adjacent parts of Bolivia. It had a magnitude of  7.8 and a maximum felt intensity of VII (Very strong) on the Mercalli intensity scale.

Tectonic setting
Chile lies above the destructive plate boundary, where the Nazca Plate is being subducted beneath the South American Plate. In the Tarapacá region the plates converge at a rate of 78 mm per year. This boundary is associated with many large earthquakes, both along the plate interface and within the downgoing slab (Nazca Plate).

Earthquake
The earthquake was an intermediate-depth event, with a hypocentral depth of 115.6 km. The focal mechanism shows that this was a normal fault event, within the subducted Nazca Plate. Finite-fault modelling of the earthquake suggests that the fault plane responsible dips to the west at about 15°.

Damage

The greatest damage occurred in northern Chile, although parts of southern Peru and western Bolivia were also affected. The earthquake triggered many landslides, blocking roads and hindering relief efforts. 550 houses were completely destroyed, with at least a further 9,350 damaged. Adobe houses on the plateau in the Andes were particularly badly affected, with more than 80% destroyed in some villages. 11 people were killed and at least a further 200 injured.

Aftermath
Initial efforts concentrated on repairing infrastructure affected by the earthquake. By June 2006 the government reported that most of the repairs to roads and irrigation canals was complete, but that, although work had started on repairing houses and schools, more needed to be done.

The effects of this earthquake on pregnant women were used to investigate the effects of acute stress on child development. The results showed that amongst poorer families, children affected by the earthquake in utero were at least six months behind in cognitive development seven years later compared to their peers in a control group in areas unaffected by the earthquake.

See also
2007 Tocopilla earthquake
2007 Aysen Fjord earthquake
2007 Peru earthquake
Great Chilean earthquake
List of earthquakes in Chile
List of earthquakes in Peru

References

External links
 
 

Tarapaca
2005 Tarapacá
Tarapaca
History of Tarapacá Region
Tarapacá earthquake
Taracapa earthquake